The M29 Weasel is a World War II tracked vehicle designed for operation in snow. Built by Studebaker, Weasels were also used in sandy, muddy, and desert terrains, including towing loads over terrain wheeled vehicles could not negotiate as in the US Marine invasions of Iwo Jima and Okinawa.  

Standard M29s were semi-amphibious, but with a very low freeboard. A M29C Water Weasel version was produced with fore and aft buoyancy cells and twin rudders.  Capable of operating in inland waterways, it however also saw limited action in surf conditions in the Pacific Theatre and during the landings on Walcheren in Europe.

Design and development
The idea for the Weasel came from the work of British inventor Geoffrey Pyke in support of his proposals to attack Axis forces and industrial installations in Norway. Pyke's plan to hamper the German nuclear weapons program became Project Plough for which he proposed a fast light mechanised device that would transport small groups of commando troops of the 1st Special Service Force across snow. In active service in Europe, Weasels were used to supply frontline troops over difficult ground when wheeled vehicles were immobilised.

The first 2,103 vehicles designated as T15 and later categorized as the M28 Cargo Carrier had  Kégresse-style "rubber-band" style tracks, the later version designated as M29 had  tracks of the same format. The T15/M28 version had a completely different hull and a reverse drive like the later M29 versions. Some of the most noticeable differences were that this early version [T15/M28] had a rear engine front wheel drive system; that used the earlier track as well as the bogie wheels which were of a distinctly different arrangement. The hull itself was designed slightly different with only a two-passenger capacity. The M29 was a front engine, rear wheel drive system with the changed tracks and different bogie wheel arrangement. The hull was also changed to accommodate a larger passenger/load capacity. The M29 was somewhat amphibious, but with a very low freeboard; the M29C Water Weasel was the more amphibious version, with buoyancy cells in the bow and stern as well as twin rudders. The M29C could not operate in other than inland waterway conditions, so its use in surf or rough water was very limited but did see action in the Pacific theatre. An easy way to distinguish the difference from an M28 and M29 is to look at the side track arrangement of bogie wheels.

Operational use

U.S. Army
The Weasel idea was introduced in 1942, when the First Special Services Force needed transportation into Norway to knock out strategic power plants. The vehicle needed to move quickly and easily through the winter snows of Norway. It needed to be air transportable and be able to withstand the effects of being dropped by parachute and would also be able to carry arms, explosives and minimal resupply stocks.

The Norwegian mission was cancelled and therefore the Weasel was never used for its original intention. However, as it was amphibious and could cross terrain too soft for most other vehicles, it was used widely in both Italy and on the Western Front. It went ashore on Normandy, it was with the U.S. Army during the breakthrough at St. Lo., the Battle of the Bulge and in the mud of the Roer and the Rhine. M29 was a Cargo Carrier but was also used as a command center, radio, ambulance and signal line layer. US soldiers soon realized the Weasel could be used as an ambulance, as it could get to places not even Jeeps could. Another use was for crossing minefields, as its ground pressure was often too low to set off anti-tank mines.

The reliability of the vehicle when used in the European summer and during long road trips was the subject of consternation among Allied troops to whom they were assigned.  The commander of the 87th Chemical Mortar Battalion left the note below during their advances towards La Ferte-Mace on D+69.

After the war, many surplus M29s were sold to allied countries (Norway, Sweden, France, etc.). Some M29C and M29 survived to serve in Korea, supplementing 1/4 ton 4x4 cargo vehicles in rough conditions. They served in Arctic and cold weather operations until retired in 1958. Large numbers of retired Weasels were sold off in the 1950s to civilians and municipal organizations. For example, 25 Weasels were loaned for the VIII Olympic Winter Games in 1960.

US Marine Corps
In November 1944, USMC distributed M29s to the 3d, 4th, and 5th Marine Divisions. They proved invaluable with its first appearance in combat on Iwo Jima. It also saw use on Okinawa.

The USMC used only the non-amphibious version, but it was capable of hauling a half-ton load through sand and mud. Besides this they pulled trailers and artillery pieces over the terrain that wheeled vehicles could not negotiate.

French Army
During the First Indochina War, the 1st Foreign Cavalry Regiment was in charge of fighting Viet Minh guerrillas in the Mekong Delta area. Its units, 1st and 2nd Escadrons, received M29C Weasels from the 13th Demi-Brigade of Foreign Legion in 1947. Initially they were unsuccessful as they were crewed by inexperienced men, used wrong tactics and were deployed without infantry support. Their losses were heavy. The  also deployed 1 Escadron of M29s from 1949 to 1953.

French soldiers learned fast after several months of fighting, but the real deployment of full forces was possible only when they received LVT-4s and LVT(A)-4s in 1950. Now they could move stronger infantry units around. In September 1951 1er Groupement Autonome was established, consisting of two escadrons of Weasels (33 each), three escadrons of LVT-4 (11 each) and one fire support platoon of 6 LVT(A)-4. French Weasels, known as Crabes were heavily armed with Chaterrault M1924/29, Bren or Browning M1919 machine guns, 57mm M18A1 recoilless guns and even 60mm mortars. 

French mountain troops and French Gendarmerie used M29s until 1970.

After the Indochina war, the remaining weasels were given to the French Polar Expeditions and used at the Antarctic station of Dumont d'Urville until 1993.

British Army 
Amphibious M29 Weasels of 4th Special Service Brigade were used by British commando troops in the Walcheren operation, supplementing LVT Buffalos. The 79th Armoured Division used also non-amphibious variant of the Weasel, modified for clearing anti-personnel devices. The Lovat Scouts used the amphibious Weasel during their time in Jasper, Alberta, where they were being trained in advanced winter and mountain warfare tactics, having already carried out the basic winter and mountain combat training in the Scottish Highlands and North Wales.

Non-amphibious Weasels were also used by British Infantry Divisions fighting in the Saar-Moselle Triangle, as they were often the only means of getting supplies forward.

After the war they were kept in service for a few years.

Canadian Army
The first use of the T15 Cargo Carrier, known to the Canadian Army as the "Snow-jeep", was in Operation Cottage in 1943 during the Aleutian Islands Campaign.  Fifty T-15 Cargo Carriers were received at Nanaimo, BC in June 1943 for use in the Aleutians by the 13th Canadian Infantry Brigade.  The T15's were some of the earliest shipments of supplies from the United States to replace Canadian Motorised Transport to be used in the joint operations.  The United States provided all military transport so to avoid having to set up a Canadian maintenance system and to provide commonality between the two armies.

M29 Weasel was used extensively by Canadian forces from the fall of 1944 during the Battle of the Scheldt to clear the marshy Scheldt estuary, the flooded approaches to the Port of  Antwerp. Later M29s supported Canadian advance through flooded areas in Netherlands and Germany. 
 
After the war, they were kept in service for use in the Arctic.

Variants

T-15 prototype
M28 (G154)
M29 (T24) without float tanks (G179)
M29C with float tanks
M29C Type A: with center-mounted 75 mm M20 recoilless rifle
M29C Type B: with (T106) rear-mounted 75 mm recoilless rifle
M29C Type C: with center-mounted 37 mm Gun M3
M29C Wasp: fitted with the same Canadian flamethrower as used on Universal Carriers

Specification
General
Weight (fighting): 
Shipping dimensions:
Uncrated; ; 
Ground clearance: 
Ground pressure: 
Pintle height (loaded): 
Electrical system: (volts) 12
Brakes: Mechanical – external contracting in differential
Transmission: Speeds: 3
Transfer case: Speeds: 2

The engine was a Studebaker Model 6-170 Champion, a 6-cylinder  cubic inch 4-stroke engine running on 72 octane gasoline delivering 70 bhp at 3,600 rpm. Under average conditions (typically 5 miles per gallon), it could range .

Performance

Gallery

See also
G-numbers
M-numbers
Universal Carrier
 C2P tractor
Raupenschlepper Ost
Vostok traverse
M7 Snow Tractor
Kettenkrad

Notes

References

TM 9-772  Technical Manual, Light Cargo Carrier T24/M29 
TM 9-1772A  Technical Manual for Engine, Engine Accessories, and Clutch for Light Cargo Carrier T24/M29
TM 9-1772B  Technical Manual for Power Train, Suspension System, Hull, and Hull Electrical System for Light Cargo Carrier T24/M29 
 ORD 7-8-9 SNL-G154 AND SNL-179 (ORDNANCE SUPPLY CATALOG, STANDARD NOMENCLATURE LIST) 
TM 11-2733 Installation of Radio Equipment in Carrier, Cargo, Light, M29 and M29C (Amphibian)

External links

Home of the M29C Water Weasel

The Wonderful M29 Weasel
M29 Weasel in ARSOF

Military vehicles of the United States
World War II armored fighting vehicles of the United States
Studebaker vehicles
Military vehicles introduced from 1940 to 1944